Laroya is a village in Shaheed Bhagat Singh Nagar district of Punjab State, India. The village is administrated by Sarpanch an elected representative of the village.

Demography 
As of 2011, Laroya has a total number of 211 houses and population of 999 of which 527 include are males while 472 are females according to the report published by Census India in 2011. The literacy rate of Laroya is 80.18%, higher than the state average of 75.84%. The population of children under the age of 6 years is 86 which is 8.61% of total population of Laroya, and child sex ratio is approximately 911 as compared to Punjab state average of 846.

Most of the people are from Schedule Caste which constitutes 27.23% of total population in Laroya. The town does not have any Schedule Tribe population so far.

As per the report published by Census India in 2011, 307 people were engaged in work activities out of the total population of Laroya which includes 288 males and 19 females. According to census survey report 2011, 77.52% workers describe their work as main work and 22.48% workers are involved in Marginal activity providing livelihood for less than 6 months.

Education 
The village has a Punjabi medium, co-ed upper primary with secondary school founded in 1976. The schools provide mid-day meal as per Indian Midday Meal Scheme. As per Right of Children to Free and Compulsory Education Act the school provide free education to children between the ages of 6 and 14.

Sikh National College Banga and Amardeep Singh Shergill Memorial college Mukandpur are the nearest colleges.

Landmarks and history 
The area earlier ruled by the Mughals. In 1634, Guru Hargobind, the sixth Sikh Guru visited here while he was on his way to Kiratpur after winning the Battle of Kartarpur with Mughals. The village has a historical Sikh shrine Gurudwara Shri Panj Tirath Sahib which was named by Guru Hargobind and it was built by Maharaja Ranjit Singh. The gurudwara is situated near by the dargah Panj Peer in Paragpur dedicated to the five peers.

Transport 

See also 
List of villages in India

References

External links 
 Tourism of Punjab
 Census of Punjab
 Locality Based PINCode

Villages in Shaheed Bhagat Singh Nagar district